Jacques Cartier (L9033) is one of five BATRAL ("Light ferry ship") vessels operated by the French Navy.

The BATRAL vessels are able to ferry over 400 tons of matériel, in the hangar and on the deck. Loading and unloading can be done from a harbour or from a beach. Two flat-bottom vessels allow unloading 50 men and light vehicles each. The accommodations are designed for a Guépard-type intervention unit (5 officers, 15 petty officers and 118 men), or for typical company-sized armoured units. A helicopter landing deck allows landing for light helicopters, and transfer from and to heavy helicopters.

Jacques Cartier was deployed to East Timor as part of the Australian-led INTERFET peacekeeping taskforce from 28 November 1999 to 12 January 2000.

She was decommissioned in July 2013 after returning from her final deployment overseas.

References

BATRAL-class landing ships
Ships built in France
Cold War amphibious warfare vessels of France
1982 ships